Ready or Not is a tactical first-person shooter developed and published by Ireland-based VOID Interactive and released for Microsoft Windows. Ready or Not follows the operations of a police SWAT team in the fictional city of Los Suenos, California in the midst of a crime wave.

Ready or Not was released through Steam Early Access on December 17, 2021. The game was well-received for its atmosphere and gameplay, and has been considered a spiritual successor to the similar SWAT series by Sierra Entertainment, but was also criticized for its heavy-handed glorification of police and questionable handling of missions depicting active shooters.

Gameplay 

In Ready or Not, the player takes the role of player character "Judge", the leader of a police tactical unit pitted against criminals. As a tactical shooter, realism is a central pillar of gameplay, with both players and enemies being killed in only a few shots; therefore, tactical strategies and careful planning is emphasized.

The player is given a wide selection of rifles, submachine guns, shotguns, and handguns to choose from, with extensive customization options for sights, rail attachments, suppressors, and other attachments. Equipment such as stun grenades, stinger grenades, fiberscopes, ballistic shields, and breaching devices are key items available for the player and their team to equip and use. As the player is part of a police unit, apprehending suspects alive is greatly encouraged; therefore, a variety of less-lethal weapons such as tasers, riot guns, and pepper spray are available as alternatives to lethal force, and players are awarded more points for arresting suspects instead of killing them.

Modes
Ready or Not's missions feature five game modes that vary in difficulty, with different rules of engagement (such as only killing a suspect if they are attempting to kill the player or others) that have penalties for violating them.

The five game modes are: "Barricaded Suspects", where suspects must be dealt with, hostages must be secured, and evidence must be collected, while following the RoE; "Raid", essentially Barricaded Suspects without RoE penalties; "Active Shooter", where a lone suspect targeting hostages must be stopped; "Bomb Threat", where bombs must be located and defused within a time limit; and "Hostage Rescue", where hostages must be saved from criminals who will attempt to execute them upon detecting police presence.

Missions are available in singleplayer with AI teammates, or cooperatively with up to four other players through online multiplayer. A competitive player versus player mode is planned for the full release.

Development 
Development began in June 2016 and a reveal trailer was released on YouTube on May 3, 2017. An alpha version of the game was made available on August 19, 2019 for owners of the Supporter Edition under a non-disclosure agreement. Select YouTubers were invited to a PvP test in April 2020 and were allowed to publish footage. A partnership with Team17 to publish the game under their label was announced on March 22, 2021. The game released to Steam Early Access on December 17, 2021.

Publishing issues 
On December 20, 2021, VOID Interactive announced that their partnership with Team17 had ended and that they would no longer be publishing the game. Speculation suggested that this was due to the developers teasing a school shooting level on Reddit one day prior, although this was denied by VOID.

On June 16, 2022, Ready or Not was delisted from Steam after a takedown request was issued against the game for trademark infringement relating to a nightclub level. Though media reports suggested it was connected to the level's release date—June 12, the anniversary of the 2016 Pulse nightclub shooting (VOID did not comment on why this date was chosen)—it was noted that the name of the in-game nightclub, "Pryzm", was also the name of a British nightclub chain owned by Rekom UK. The game returned to Steam on June 18 with the infringing elements removed.

Reception 
Ready or Not was the best selling game on Steam in the week after its release and has been described as a spiritual successor to the SWAT series and early Rainbow Six games.

Ross Vernon of GameTyrant praised the game, stating it was "on track to becoming something great upon final release". Christian Schwarz of GameStar praised the gameplay and atmosphere, but noted it was "still a long way" from reaching the prestige of the SWAT series. Andres Berumen of FPS Champion highlighted the game's immersion and extensive customization and loadout options for an early access game, but criticized the game's "glitchy and illogical" AI and lack of a tutorial.

Rick Lane, writing for NME, praised the atmosphere and similarities to SWAT 4, but noted he felt uncomfortable with the game's "propaganda"-like depiction of law enforcement, especially in the wake of the George Floyd protests, and opined VOID Interactive would be unable to effectively handle the game's subject matter unless "it is willing to ask the questions that SWAT 4 never did".

Ethan Gach, writing an early review for Kotaku, called Ready or Not a “tactical horror game” and “an unsettling SWAT fantasy”, praising its atmosphere but also criticizing it as tasteless due to insensitivity towards police brutality and jarring tonal shifts between crude humor and dark drama. Gach also unfavorably highlighted apparent references to alt-right memes such as redpill and the use of “Jogger” as a racist euphemism (in reference to Ahmaud Arbery), which VOID responded to, denying any connection to extremism, claiming the alleged dog whistles were coincidental, and stating they would remove the references in question.

References

External links 

 

Upcoming video games
Early access video games
Windows games
Cooperative video games
2021 video games
Windows-only games
Tactical shooter video games
First-person shooters
Unreal Engine games
Video games about police officers
Video games developed in Ireland
Video games set in the United States